Ellis, Beggs & Howard (EBH) are an English pop music band formed in London in 1987. Its members are Simon Ellis (born 18 May 1961 in Yorkshire), Nick Beggs (born 15 December 1961 in Buckinghamshire) and Austin Howard (born 22 July 1965 in London).

Career
Ellis, Beggs & Howard are made up of Simon Ellis (keyboards and programming), Nick Beggs (bass guitar and Chapman stick), and Austin Howard (vocals). They were augmented by Paul Harvey on guitar, Robbie France on drums and Harry Sutcliffe on keyboards and programming. They experimented with several other guitarists, including Marty Williamson, Keith Airey and Sabu Bugaban.

EBH started in late 1987 by playing a few low-key gigs in London. They featured in the NME sponsored shows at The Greyhound in Fulham, and a performance at the nightclub Heaven, and later in bigger arenas.

EBH found success in Continental Europe. Their first single, "Big Bubbles, No Troubles" (produced by Ralph Ruppert and Lux), was a hit in 1988, receiving several awards in many countries. On the UK Singles Chart, the single reached number 41.

After the failure of their first album, Homelands, in the United Kingdom, and despite its success elsewhere in Europe, tensions in the band became overwhelming.  Nevertheless, from 1989 they recorded the basic tracks of what was to have been their second album with the Fleetwood Mac Mobile, at the Eazee Hire rehearsal complex in London. The album was not released by a label at the time, although Beggs made it available several years later as a home-grown CDr release entitled The Lost Years Vol. 1. The album is notable for contributions from Warren Cuccurullo and Robert Fripp.

Band members

Main line-up
 Simon Ellis – keyboards, programming, backing vocals (1987–1991; 2021—present)
 Nick Beggs – bass guitar, Chapman Stick, backing vocals (1987–1991; 2021—present)
 Austin Howard – lead vocals, percussion (1987–1991; 2021—present)

Former members
 Paul Harvey – guitar (1987–1990)
 Robbie France – drums (1987–1990; died 2012)

References

English pop music groups
British musical trios
Musical groups established in 1987
Musical groups disestablished in 1991
Musical groups reestablished in 2021
Musical groups from London